Montgomery Township is one of thirteen townships in Owen County, Indiana, United States. As of the 2010 census, its population was 1,304 and it contained 569 housing units.

History
Montgomery Township was founded in 1819.

Geography

Unincorporated towns
 Carp at 
 Cuba at 
(This list is based on USGS data and may include former settlements.)

Cemeteries
The township contains these three cemeteries: Cloyd, Kaufman and Smith.

Major highways
  U.S. Route 231
  Indiana State Road 67

Lakes
 Amazon Lake

School districts
 Spencer-Owen Community Schools

Political districts
 State House District 46
 State Senate District 37

References
 
 United States Census Bureau 2009 TIGER/Line Shapefiles
 IndianaMap

External links
 Indiana Township Association
 United Township Association of Indiana
 City-Data.com page for Montgomery Township

Townships in Owen County, Indiana
Townships in Indiana